Live at Irving Plaza 4.18.06 is an album by Shooter Jennings. It was released on October 10, 2006, on the Universal South label.

Track listing

Personnel
Shooter Jennings - guitar, lead vocals
Ted Russell Kamp - bass guitar, backing vocals
Bryan Keeling - drums
LeRoy Powell - guitar, backing vocals
Steven Van Zandt - guitar on "Intro by Little Steven"

Chart performance

References

Shooter Jennings albums
2006 live albums
Albums produced by Dave Cobb
Show Dog-Universal Music live albums